The Kobon triangle problem is an unsolved problem in combinatorial geometry first stated by Kobon Fujimura (1903-1983). The problem asks for the largest number N(k) of nonoverlapping triangles whose sides lie on an arrangement of k lines. Variations of the problem consider the projective plane rather than the Euclidean plane, and require that the triangles not be crossed by any other lines of the arrangement.

Known upper bounds 
Saburo Tamura proved that the number of nonoverlapping triangles realizable by  lines is at most . G. Clément and J. Bader proved more strongly that this bound cannot be achieved when  is congruent to 0 or 2 (mod 6). The maximum number of triangles is therefore at most one less in these cases. The same bounds can be equivalently stated, without use of the floor function, as:

Solutions yielding this number of triangles are known when  is 3, 4, 5, 6, 7, 8, 9, 13, 15 or 17. For k = 10, 11 and 12, the best solutions known reach a number of triangles one less than the upper bound.

Known constructions 

Given a perfect solution with k0 > 3 lines, other Kobon triangle solution numbers can be found for all ki-values where

by using the procedure by D. Forge and J. L. Ramirez Alfonsin. For example, the solution for k0 = 5 leads to the maximal number of nonoverlapping triangles for k = 5, 9, 17, 33, 65, ....

Examples

See also
Roberts's triangle theorem, on the minimum number of triangles that  lines can form

References

External links
Johannes Bader, "Kobon Triangles"

Discrete geometry
Unsolved problems in geometry
Recreational mathematics
Triangles